Architecture + Women New Zealand (A+W NZ) is a membership-based professional organisation of women in architecture in New Zealand.  They promote diversity, inclusion and equity in architecture through events, membership, advocacy and publication. They also run the regular A+W NZ Dulux Awards.

History 
The organisation was founded in 2011 by Lynda Simmons, Julie Wilson and Megan Rule. Simmons and Wilson were motivated due to the large number of women leaving the architecture profession in New Zealand. Their core aims are visibility for members and to increase inclusiveness in the architectural profession by highlighting and addressing barriers. It was one of the 'recent advocacy groups for gender equity' and at the start was a website and database to promote diversity, inclusion and equity in architecture. In 2013 Elisapeta Heta joined. 

In 2013 A+W NZ created an exhibition called Between Silos that was inspired by an exhibition 20 years prior called Constructive Agenda – 60 Years of Women in Architecture in New Zealand. Between Silos was written by Marianne Calvelo, with design by Joy Roxas and curated by Lynda Simmons. The exhibition was also presented by Te Pūtahi Centre for Architecture and City Making in Christchurch as part of their Open Christchurch programme.

Part of the work of the group is advocacy and this includes creating submissions to Parliament on relevant legislation. There is also a Tatuhi Drawing Archive, newsletters and mentoring.

In 2013 the membership of A+W NZ was almost 1000 people.   

In 2022 Architecture + Women New Zealand was the inaugural winner of the 2022 John Sutherland Practice Award by Te Kāhui Whaihanga New Zealand Institute of Architects to acknowledge their 'profound contribution' since starting and that by removing barriers within architecture they are benefiting the profession as a whole.   

The book Making Space: A History of New Zealand Women in Architecture (2022) edited by Elizabeth Cox was published by Massey University Press in association with Architecture + Women NZ.

A+W NZ Dulux Awards 
The A + W NZ Dulux Awards were first run in 2014 and are a triennial awards programme with three award categories.

Wirihana Leadership Award 
The award open to all A+W NZ members who are in their second decade after the date of their graduation. The award is named after Moana Wirihana (Te Kawerau ā Maki) whose leadership saw the design and construction of many wharenui (meeting houses) in New Zealand.

2014

Winner:  Cecile Bonnifait, Bonnifait + Giesen Atelier Workshop

Finalists: Andrea Bell, Maggie Carroll, Sarah Gilbertson, Marianne Riley

2017

Winner: Bureaux Ltd (Jessica Barter and Maggie Carroll)

Finalists: Mary Henry (Jasmax), Natasha Markham (MAUD), Rogan Nash (Kate Rogan and Eva Nash), Sophie Wylie (Artifact)

2020

Winner: Louise Wright (Assembly Architects)

Finalists: Natalie Allen (The Urban Advisory), Felicity Brenchley (Felicity Brenchley Architects + ĀKAU), Ilona Haghshenas (Warren and Mahoney), Fiona Short (Warren and Mahoney)

Munro Diversity Award 
This award is "open to all genders, and looks specifically for evidence of continued support strategies for diversity in the workplace, including but not necessarily restricted to gender". The award is named for the structural problems in early New Zealand architecture where affluence was a requirement for education, and bias meant women often were not named architect even though this is what they were doing.

2014

Winner: Justine Clark & Gill Matthewson (Parlour)

Finalists: Amanda Reynolds, Smith and Scully Architects, Studio Pacific, Thursday Lunch Group ( including Claire Chambers, Denise Civil, Ellen Brinkman)

2017

Winner: Lindley Naismith (Scarlet Architects)

Finalists: Jade Kake (of Matakohe Architecture and Urbanism Ltd & Te Matapihi he tirohangi mo te Iwi Trust, Dorita Hannah (University of Tasmania), Jane Hill (Chow: Hill), Gillian Macleod & Jackie Gillies (MH Gillian Macleod & Origin Consultants)

2020

Winner: Jade Kake (of Matakohe Architecture and Urbanism Ltd)

Finalists: ĀKAU, Jasmax, Katherine Skipper (Warren and Mahoney), Julie Wilson

Chrystall Excellence Award 
This award is open for women who have had three or more decades of architecture practice. It is named for Lillian Chrystall who in 1967 was the first woman win an NZIA national award.

2014

Winner: Julie Stout, Mitchell & Stout Architects

Finalists: Min Hall, Gina Jones, Lindy Leuschke, Sarah Scott

2017

Winner: Sarah Treadwell (retired, University of Auckland)

Finalists: Jane Aimer and Lindley Naismith (Scarlet Architects), Clare Athfield (Athfield Architects), Megan Edwards (Megan Edwards Architects), Briar Green (Pearson and Associates)

2020

Winner: Christina van Bohemen (of Sills van Bohemen)

Finalists: Robin Allison (Earthsong Eco-Neighbourhood), Fiona Christeller (architecture FCA), Deborah Cranko (Cranko Architects), Anne Salmond (Salmond Architecture)

References 

Architecture in New Zealand
2011 establishments in New Zealand
Architecture-related professional associations
Professional associations based in New Zealand
Feminism and the arts